The Millstone is a novel by Margaret Drabble, first published in 1965.
It is about an unmarried, young academic who becomes pregnant after a one-night stand and, against all odds, decides to give birth to her child and raise it herself.

Title
Drabble has acknowledged the source of the title to be in Christ's words: "But whoso shall offend one of these little ones who believe in me, it were better that a millstone were hanged about his neck and that he were drowned in the depth of the sea" (Matthew 18:6). The parallel between Christ's words and the plot of the novel is established through the innocent though illegitimate baby, Octavia, the "little one", who is subject to harm, her congenital heart defect rendering her vulnerable in the extreme. Christ's warning of punishment to would-be agents of harm is echoed in the fiercely loving protectiveness of Rosamund, the child's mother. The Millstone, Drabble said in 2011, is about how maternity "changes you into something fiercer than you were before."

Three of Drabble's first six novels have Biblical titles – a remnant perhaps of her Quaker education. The Millstone was the first, the other two being Jerusalem the Golden (1967) and The Needle's Eye (1972).

Plot summary
Set in not-quite-yet Swinging London, The Millstone focuses on the life of Rosamund Stacey, an attractive Cambridge graduate who is writing her thesis on early English poetry while living alone in the spacious flat of her parents, who have gone to Africa for a year on a philanthropic mission. While Rosamund is convinced of both her qualities as a literary historian and her Socialist—and in particular Fabian—ideals, she is rather reluctant when it comes to sex. To avoid being considered old-fashioned or priggish, she has managed to make her small but intimate circle of friends believe that she is carrying on with two men at the same time whereas in fact she is still a virgin and only enjoys her two male friends' company. Each of the men also thinks that she is sleeping with the other one so neither of them presses her to have sex with him.

In a pub Rosamund meets George Matthews, a newsreader for BBC Radio, and at once feels attracted to him although she is quite sure right from the start that he is gay. They end up in her flat and eventually have sex. As George is also under the impression that she has two lovers, Rosamund has no need to hide the fact that this is in fact her first time. Too shy to tell him that she has fallen in love with him, and now believing that he is bisexual, she lets George vanish from her life as quickly as he entered it, in the ensuing months only occasionally listening to his voice on the radio.

When she learns that she is pregnant, a whole new world opens up to her. While she decides against telling George or writing to her parents in order not to unnecessarily upset them, she hopes she will get moral support from her sister Beatrice and her husband, who have three small children themselves. However, in a letter to her sister Beatrice expresses her shock and disbelief and urges Rosamund either to have an abortion or to give birth to the baby and put it up for adoption immediately afterwards, and then carry on with her life and academic career as if nothing had happened. After a half-hearted attempt at inducing a miscarriage, she decides to have the baby and be one of the women Bernard Shaw refers to as "women who want children but no husband".

Her friends take the news well and without asking too many questions about the identity of the father, who, they secretly assume, must be one of her two lovers. Rosamund, however, stops seeing the two men and focuses on her work and her pregnancy. She finds a true friend in Lydia Reynolds, a young novelist who happily takes her up on her offer to share her flat with her in return for the occasional babysitting job once her child has been born. For the first time in her life Rosamund has to deal with the National Health Service and all its inadequacies. When her daughter is born, she decides to name her Octavia after Octavia Hill.

When she is only a few months old, Octavia is found to have a serious condition of the pulmonary artery, and surgery is unavoidable. However, the operation turns out to be successful, and Rosamund is allowed to take her daughter home after weeks of anxiety. Lydia, who is now having an affair with one of Rosamund's former "lovers", still lives with her even after Octavia, just for a few minutes left to her own devices, has crawled into Lydia's room and partly ripped, partly chewed up a major part of the typescript of her new novel. Rosamund's parents are informed about the existence of their grandchild through a letter from Octavia's surgeon, who happens to be an old acquaintance of theirs, but they tactfully decide not to disturb their daughter's new life and stay abroad for another year rather than return for Christmas as planned.

The final scene of the novel takes place late at night on Christmas Eve, when Rosamund has to go to an all-night chemist's near her flat to get some medicine for Octavia. There, she has a chance meeting with George, and again invites him up to her flat. Rosamund lies about the age of Octavia, so that George will not suspect that she might be his. Reluctantly, George is persuaded to have a look at the sleeping Octavia, pronounces her a beautiful baby, and leaves again.

Film adaptation
This novel was adapted into the film A Touch of Love (American title: Thank You All Very Much) in 1969. The film varies little from the novel in plot.

References

1965 British novels
British novels adapted into films
Casual sex in fiction
English novels
John Llewellyn Rhys Prize-winning works
Novels about human pregnancy
Novels by Margaret Drabble
Novels set in London
Weidenfeld & Nicolson books